Kamali From Nadukkaveri is a 2021 Indian Tamil language drama film written and directed by Rajasekar Duraisamy on his directorial debut. The film stars Anandhi, Rohit Saraf and Prathap Pothen. The film had its theatrical release on 19 February 2021 and opened to positive reviews from critics.

Plot 
Kamali Shanmugam is a naughty, happy-go-lucky girl who lives in the village Nadukkaveri in Tamil Nadu. She studies in a Tamil medium state board school there. She has an elder brother who studies in a convent because her father doesn't believe in properly educating a girl. Her brother earns the fury of their father after he fails his 12th board exams. She doesn't have a big dream until she sees the interview of the CBSE national topper Ashwin, a handsome boy from Chennai, who later goes to IIT Madras. Kamali falls in love with Ashwin at first sight whom she has never seen before and aspires to join IIT only for him. She realizes that joining there is very hard for a girl like her and seeks help from her best friend, Valli, who knows Kamali's love for Ashwin, to help her. Her father puts forth a condition that if she fails to clear the exams, she had to marry her relative. Subramani, a teacher in her school suggests her to seek guidance from retired professor Arivudainambi but a trouble seems to await her as the professor has been the person who was irritated by Kamali's Tactics earlier. Yet she tries to impress the man, but all in vain, as he refuses, in anger, to coach her. However, the following day, he calls to apologize to her only to realize that she really has the potential to crack Jee Mains and Advanced . Since, that day, Kamali regularly and sincerely attends coaching sessions that helps her excel in studies at her school as well. She successfully cracks the entrance exams that earns her a seat in the B.Tech Computer Science department in IIT Madras.

She later shifts to her hostel room there that is shared with an arrogant girl, chemical engineering batch. She becomes jealous upon learning that a village girl like Kamali scored better than her in the entrance exam. Kamali, being childish and innocent, considers her a friend and tells her roommate that she came there in search of a boy she is in love with. Kamali stumbles upon Ashwin there, and she madly starts to follow him wherever he goes and comes. She is shown to be jealous of Ashwin's best friend, Priya with whom he is close with. All seems to go fine until the semester results come out and Kamali realizes that she has failed the exams. A professor comes to her and asks about the reason for the failure, a frightful surprise waits for her when one of her classmates tell the sir that 'She was busy wooing her Prince here'. She feels dejected when the students there nickname her 'Cinderella'. She becomes the famous topic there and everyone learns about her love. 

Embarrassed, she sits in a deserted cafeteria only to be interrupted by Ashwin and his gang. She overhears Ashwin's conversation about her being the 'Cinderella' girl and her heart breaks when he tells his friends that he definitely cannot be the 'joker' Kamali is in love with. Heartbroken, she confronts Her Roommate when she realizes that her Roommate was the one who spread her secret about her love. Her Roommate, who now started to like Kamali, apologizes to her but Kamali never listens to her and angrily packs her belongings to return to Nadukkaveri. She is solemn in her village. She meets her professor Arivu, who now teaches many kids there to write entrance exams. She realizes that her teacher loves and trusts her immensely, she becomes ashamed of herself for following a boy instead of studying. So, reformed and feeling better, she musters up courage back to her college. Kamali now starts to focus completely on studies and pushes her thoughts of Ashwin completely away and avoids him. She starts getting good grades there. Roommate and Kamali become friends and write a quiz. To Kamali's dismay, She learns that Ashwin and she, are selected for the inter-IIT National Quiz competition and refuses to go. Her roommate convinces her telling that it may be a good exposure for her. Ashwin becomes annoyed when he finds that Kamali is selected instead of his friend, Priya. 

Ashwin, Kamali and an IIT professor travel to Delhi for the competition. She, uncomfortable with Ashwin's presence, spills coffee on her dress and embarrasses herself in front of Ashwin. He asks her if she's still in love with her 'prince' to which she replies 'I don't know but definitely he's my inspiration'. Kamali gets an unknown admirer, Varun Singh, a contestant from IIT Kanpur. Varun tries to flirt with her during breakfast which Ashwin realizes and advises her to stay away from Varun. The competition, telecast in TV is watched proudly by Kamali's family. Kamali blunders in the first round but luckily get qualified to finals after another team gets disqualified. Ashwin becomes mad at her and scolds her later. IIT Madras and IIT Kanpur ties in the final round. For the tie breaker, Varun Singh from the opposite team, chooses Kamali as his opponent realizing her weakness. But Kamali however answers correctly to win the Quiz making Ashwin delighted. Her family, who had been watching her in TV, get happy tears since Kamali becomes an inspiration for all children in Nadukkaveri. Ashwin realizes that he was Kamali's crush. He stares at Kamali while returning in the train. He responds by pouring the coffee on himself when she finds him looking at her. He asks her if the boy she loved was him. She responds 'Maybe' smiling back. 

It is shown here that Ashwin has developed feelings for Kamali finally and the film comes to an end.

Cast 

 Anandhi as Kamali Shanmugam 
 Rohit Saraf as Ashwin Anand
 Prathap Pothen as Arivudainambi
 Srijaa Priyadarshini as Valli
 Abitha Venkat as Nethra, Kamali's roommate 
 Azhagam Perumal as Shanmugam, Kamali's father
 Imman Annachi as Subramani
 Sushila Natraj as Kamali's grandmother
 Rekha Suresh as Kamali's mother
 T. M. Karthik as Professor
 Giri Balasubramanium as Quizmaster Pickbrain (guest appearance)
 Syed Irfan as Varun Singh from IIT Kanpur

Production
The film began production under the title Enga Andha Vaan in July 2019.

Release 
The film was initially slated for a theatrical release on 17 April 2020 but was postponed due to the COVID-19 pandemic. The film had its theatrical release on 19 February 2021 with 50% seating capacity. The film's satellite rights and digital rights were sold to Zee Tamil and Zee5.

References

External links 
 
2021 films
2020s Tamil-language films
2021 drama films
Indian drama films